The Brahman languages, Biyom and Tauya, form a subbranch of the Rai Coast branch of the Madang languages of Papua New Guinea. The family is named after the cattle station and town of Brahman, which lies between the territories of the two languages.

Genetic relations
John Z'graggen (1971, 1975) classified four languages as Brahman, Biyom, Faita, Isabi, Tauya.

Ross (2005) broke up Brahman, placing Faita among the Sogeram languages (another sub-branch of Madang) and Isabi among the unrelated Goroka languages – a position followed by Usher (2018).

References

Rai Coast languages
Languages of Papua New Guinea